Holonema is an extinct genus of relatively large, barrel-shaped arthrodire placoderms that were found in oceans throughout the world from the Mid to Late Devonian, when the last species perished in the Frasnian-Fammian extinction event.  Most species of the genus are known from fragments of their armor, but the Gogo Reef species, H. westolli, is known from whole, articulated specimens.

Description
Holonema is thought to have been a benthic-dwelling fish, based on its cambered body shape, which performs better hydrodynamically when closer to the sea bed. Although previously thought to have fed in the bottom seafloor mud, more recent morphological studies of the jaw and toothplates suggest a more planktivorous lifestyle. Holonema fossil individuals have small stones in the trunk shield, and pieces of feldspar in the abdominal region, suggesting Holonema used these as gastroliths for processing food.

Species

H. rugosum
H. rugosum is the type species.  It was originally described as a species of the antiarch genus, Pterichthys.  Fossils are found in Frasnian strata of New York and Pennsylvania, and Givetian strata of Wisconsin and Michigan.  It is a fairly large species, though the type specimen is of an 18 centimeter long median dorsal plate belonging to a small individual.  Fossils of H. horridum and Glyptaspis eastmani may be this species.  Fossils from Frasnian Iran (H. cf. rugosum) may also belong to this species.<ref name=Denison>{{cite book|last=Denison|first=Robert|title=Placodermi Volume 2 of Handbook of Paleoichthyology'''|year=1978|publisher=Gustav Fischer Verlag|location=Stuttgart New York|isbn=978-0-89574-027-4|pages=63}}</ref>

H. arcticum
A large species from Givetian-aged strata in Novaya Zemlya, Russia, known only from two plates from one individual's trunk shield.

H. bruehniH. bruehni is a recently discovered species from the Middle Eifelian-aged Brandenberg stratum of Sauerland, Northwestern Germany.  Juveniles had a dermal ornamentation of irregularly spaced tubercles, while the dermal surface of adults' armor were smooth.

H. farrowi
Known from fragments from the Givetian-aged "Traverse Group" stratum in Michigan.  The median dorsal plates range up to 20 cm in length.  The median dorsal plate is fairly broad at the posterior end, but narrows as one approaches the anterior end.

H. haiti
Known from fragments from the Givetian section of the Jefferson formation in Idaho. The median dorsal plate is estimated to be about 28 cm in length, and is very narrow compared to those of other species.

H. harmae
Found in the Givetian-aged Burtnieki beds of Estonia.  It is distinguished from other species in that the spinal and subpectoral margins of the anterior-ventral plates meet at almost a right angle.

H. obrutshevi
Found in the Eifelian-aged Aruküla beds of Estonia.  The median dorsal plate has a small, horn-like process, and the trunkshield is somewhat circular when viewed from the top or bottom.

H. ornatum
From the Givetian-aged Bressay flags of the Shetland Islands.  Imperfectly known.  Denison 1978 suggests that it may not belong to Holonema.

H. radiatum
This species is known primarily from the Frasnian-aged Shelon beds of the Baltic, and the Donetz Basin of Russia.  Specimens and fragments from the Frasnian-aged Holy Cross Mountain of Poland, and the Givetian sections of the Fiskekløfta formation in Spitzbergen.  It is a fairly large species with a moderately narrow median dorsal plate.  The median dorsal plate averages about 30 cm in length.

H. westolli
This is the best-known species of the genus, known from numerous, often articulated specimens from the Frasnian-aged Gogo Reef. The species is very similar to H. rugosum'', but the trunk shield is comparatively more narrow. The median dorsal averages about 23 cm in length, and the average body length of living individuals are estimated to be around 150 cm.

References

Further reading 
 Case, Gerald Ramon. A Pictorial Guide to Fossils
 Long, John. Swimming In Stone

Holonematidae
Late Devonian animals
Placoderms of Asia
Placoderms of Australia
Placoderms of Europe
Placoderms of North America
Gogo fauna
Middle Devonian first appearances
Late Devonian genus extinctions
Givetian life
Frasnian life
Paleontology in New York (state)
Paleontology in Pennsylvania
Paleontology in Wisconsin
Paleontology in Michigan
Fossils of Russia
Paleontology in Idaho
Fossils of Estonia
Fossils of Great Britain
Fossils of Australia
Fossil taxa described in 1889